Looneyville is an unincorporated community on Flat Creek of the Pocatalico River in Roane County, West Virginia, United States. It is located on West Virginia Route 36. The community is named for Robert Looney, a pioneer settler. The post office  was established in 1870.

References

Unincorporated communities in Roane County, West Virginia
Unincorporated communities in West Virginia